Nanami Takenaka (born 2 December 1998) is a Japanese group rhythmic gymnast.

She was part of the Japanese squad at two world championships, in 2017 in Pesaro, Italy, and in 2019 in Baku, Azerbaijan. In 2017, Japan won bronze in the group all-around, bronze in 5 hoops, and silver in 3 ropes + 2 balls. In 2019, it was silver in the group all-around, silver in 3 hoops + 4 clubs and gold in 5 balls.

Takenaka is set to compete at the 2020 Summer Olympics.

References 

1998 births
Japanese rhythmic gymnasts
Living people
Olympic gymnasts of Japan
Gymnasts at the 2020 Summer Olympics
Sportspeople from Nagoya
21st-century Japanese women